The Mullendore Mansion is a two-and-one-half-story Greek Revival structure in Cleveland, Oklahoma. Listed on the National Register of Historic Places in 1984, it was built in 1910 on  overlooking the Arkansas River by E. C. Mullendore, an influential Oklahoma rancher and banker, who used it as his home until his death in 1938.

References

Houses on the National Register of Historic Places in Oklahoma
Houses completed in 1910
Buildings and structures in Pawnee County, Oklahoma
National Register of Historic Places in Pawnee County, Oklahoma